Forena is a trade union in Sweden with a membership of 13,000 which organises workers in the insurance sector.

References

Swedish Confederation of Professional Employees
Trade unions in Sweden